Between Two Worlds is an Australian television drama series which premiered on the Seven Network on 26 July 2020.

Plot
The series revolves around two families. The Walford family is headed by wealthy tycoon Phillip Walford, his wife Cate and privileged son Bart. Their world is penthouses, luxury cars and designer offices. The Grey family consists of single mother Sophia, footballer son Danny, and daughter Bella. Their world is suburbia, work and sport. The two worlds become linked by an unexpected incident.

Cast
Philip Quast as Phillip Walford
Hermione Norris as Cate Walford
Sara Wiseman as Sophia Grey
Aaron Jeffery as David Starke
Alex Cubis as Danny Grey
Megan Hajjar as Bella Grey
Tom Dalzell as Bart Walford
Melanie Jarnson as Georgia Konig
Marny Kennedy as Martina Budd
Gabriella Hirschson as Carrie Starke
Andrew McFarlane as Gareth Konig
Dominic Alburn as Mikael Stein

Production
The series began filming in Sydney in April 2019. The series was created by Bevan Lee.

Release
The series premiered on the Seven Network at 8:30 p.m. on 26 July 2020.

Reception 
Poor ratings after the second episode led Seven to reschedule the show to a late night timeslot. Despite the series ending on a cliffhanger, Seven axed the show after one season.

Episodes

References

External links

2020 Australian television series debuts
2020 Australian television series endings
English-language television shows
Seven Network original programming
Television series about families
Television shows set in New South Wales
Television series by Seven Productions